North Luwu Regency is a regency of South Sulawesi Province of Indonesia. It covers 7,502.58 kim2 and had a population of 287,606 at the 2010 census and 322,919 at the 2020 census, comprising 163,168 males and 159,751 females; the o0fficial estimate as at mid 2021 was 325,052. The principal town lies at Masamba.

Administrative districts 
North Luwu Regency in 2010 comprised eleven administrative Districts (Kecamatan), but subsequently four further districts have been added by the division of existing districts. These fifteen districts are tabulated below with their areas and their populations at the 2010 census and the 2020 census, together with the official estimates as at mid 2021. The table also includes the locations of the district administrative centres, the numbers of administrative villages in each district (totalling 7 urban kelurahan and 166 rural desa), and its post code.

Notes: (a) including one kelurahan (the district administrative centre)(b) the 2010 population of the new Sabbang Selatan District is included in the figure for Selatan District. (c) the 2010 population of the new Baebunta Selatan District is included in the figure for Baebunta District. (d) the 2010 population of the new Sukamaju Selatan District is included in the figure for Sukamaju District. (e) the 2010 population of the new Tanalili District is included in the figure for Bone-Bone District. (f) including four kelurahan (named in next line) and 15 desa. (g) except for 
the desa of Balebo (or Baloli) which has a post code of 92912, and the kelurahan of Kappuna (post code 91913), Bone (92914), Kasimbong (92915) and Baliase (92916).

References

Regencies of South Sulawesi